Skafandr  (Cyrillic: Скафандр) is a popular Russian band playing in the self-definet "metal-dub" style. Skafandr was formed in 1998 by Eugeniy Rybnikov, Yuriy Vitel, and Kirill Soloviyov in Saint Petersburg. Until 2001 the band was giving concerts with Anna Stolyarova's vocals, but since then focused on instrumental music only.

Annually Skafandr gives around 40 concert performances all around Russia, and has recorded three full studio albums on their own record label "Metal Dub Sound System".

With the band's permission, several tracks from its second CD have been used as the soundtrack for animated shorts on Mult.ru - home of Masyanya.
 
The first animated music video Human created by Toondra animation studio got "Best music video of the 2006 year" award on RAMP Festival

Skafandr also produced the soundtrack for the video game Stalingrad.

Members
 Eugeniy Rybnikov (Евгений Рыбников) - Guitar
 Yuriy Vitel (Юрий Витель) - Bass
 Kirill Soloviyov (Кирилл Соловьев) - drums

Discography

Albums
 EP 8-812 (with Anna Stolyarova) — 2001
 EP Навстречу Солнцу и Свету (Towards The Sun and The Light) — 2002
 EP "Эпизод 3: Марш Красных Раскрепощенных Роботов По Планете Марс (Episode III: The March of Red Emancipated Robots Over Planet Mars) — 2003
 LP Марш Красных Роботов(The March of Red Robots) — 2004
 LP Навстречу Солнцу И Свету — 2005
 LP Kill Voice — 2006
 LP  Тяжелый Шар Земной — 2007
 LP  Glaz — 2012

Video games

 Stalingrad (2005 video game)

External links 
 Official site's main page 
 Official English info site
 Skafandr Page on Facebook.com
 Music samples from Last.fm
 One of the Mult.ru shorts, featuring Skafandr's music 
 "Best russian alternative music video of the 2006 year" (RAMP-2006 award) with Skafandr music

Musical groups from Saint Petersburg
Russian heavy metal musical groups